Petru Buburuz (born September 26, 1937, Durleşti) is an Orthodox parish priest and politician from the Republic of Moldova. He served as a member of the Supreme Soviet of the Soviet Union and editor in chief of Luminătorul.

Biography 

Petru Buburuz was born to Dumitru and Anastasia, on September 26, 1937 in Durleşti. In 1989 election, Buburuz campaigned under the motto "The People's Will--God's Will" and was elected as a member of the Supreme Soviet of the Soviet Union.

Buburuz's victory made him probably the only clergyman thus far known to have been elected to the Congress of People's Deputies of the Soviet Union as an unofficial candidate affiliated with informal national movements. He was also a contributor to Glasul (for which he has been admonished by the Chişinău metropolitanate). On August 27, 1989, Buburuz blessed the Grand National Assembly in Chişinău.

References

External links 
 Vladimir Socor, Update on the Moldavian Elections to the USSR Congress of People's Deputies
 50 de personalităţi ale epocee 87-89
 Timpul de dimineaţă, [PDF] Catedrala lui Petru Buburuz
 Patriarhul Daniel îl sfătuieşte pe preotul Petru Buburuz să dea dovadă de tact şi ascultare faţă de Mitropolia Basarabiei
 Buburuz Petru
 Literatura şi Arta, OMUL SPIRITUALITĂŢII CU RĂDĂCINI DIVINE STRĂMOŞEŞTI

1937 births
Moldovan journalists
Male journalists
Soviet politicians
Popular Front of Moldova politicians
Romanian people of Moldovan descent
Living people